Dustin Brown and Rameez Junaid were the defending champions but Brown decided not to participate.
As a result, Junaid played alongside Frank Moser and this pair won the tournament, defeating Jorge Aguilar and Júlio César Campozano 6–2, 6–7(2), [10–6] in the final.

Seeds

Draw

Draw

References
 Main Draw

Franken Challenge - Doubles
2011 Singles